Blind is a seven-part Australian web television dramedy series, created and written by James Cripps and directed by Andre Muller. Set in one room over the course of a summer, the series follows five young friends as they try to navigate the world and each other.

Synopsis
Blind is a youth-based comedy-drama web series where the forces of love, music, drugs, friendship and spirituality collide in the heightened environment of the Sweaty Bender Room, a place where the party never stops.

Through the minefield of a summer's worth of partying, idealistic space cadet Ali pursues his dream girl: the hypnotic and insightful Chelsea. For Ali friendship is eternal, music is emotion, drugs are life-enhancers, and love is pure and poetic. However he soon finds out how finite and fickle these conceptions are. Between his cynical best friend Jake, the off-his-lips party-animal Yogi and the heart-on-her-sleeve wild child Stacey, Ali tries to make sense of life, believing the answer is Chelsea. But like the high they are all so wrapped up in, these naïve ideas will eventually come crashing down.

Production

Originally titled Kick On Kids, the series was first conceptualised while Cripps and Muller were students at Macquarie University in late 2012. The production team began casting in late 2014, casting mostly unknown local actors and actresses in the lead roles, as well as Puberty Blues actress, Ellie Gall. To fund the project, the team ran a fundraising campaign through the crowdfunding site, Indiegogo, with a target of $15,000.

In addition to telling youth-oriented stories that they felt had been neglected by Australia's free-to-air television networks, Cripps and Muller said they wanted to highlight emerging young artists, booking local musicians and designers to score the series and dress the actors early in the pre-production phase.

Distribution

Retitled as Blind, the series was announced as the first OzFlix Original for the Australian-only content streaming service. The series was later picked up Twisted Mirror TV in the United Kingdom and Ireland, and SeekaTV in North America.

Cast
 Ryan Light as Ali Wylde
 Crystal Moran as Chelsea
 Kurt Winter as Jake
 Ellie Gall as Stacey
 Matt Castley as Yogi

Awards

See also 
 List of Australian television series

References

2019 Australian television series debuts
English-language television shows